Sphaerium nitidum is a species of mollusc belonging to the family Sphaeriidae.

Its native range is Subarctic.

References

Sphaeriidae
Molluscs described in 1876